Frank Langella is an American actor of the stage and screen.

He has received various awards and nominations including an Academy Award for Best Actor nomination for his performance as Richard Nixon in Ron Howard's political drama Frost/Nixon (2008). He also earned British Academy Film Award, Golden Globe Award and Screen Actors Guild Award nominations for his performance in the film. He also has received Screen Actors Guild Award nominations Good Night and Good Luck (2005), Captain Fantastic (2016), and finally winning for Outstanding Ensemble Cast in a Motion Picture for Aaron Sorkin's courtroom drama The Trial of the Chicago 7 (2019). For his work on stage he received seven Tony Award nominations winning four times for his performances in Seascape in 1975, Fortune's Fool in 2002, Frost/Nixon in 2008, and The Father in 2016. For his work on television he received a Primetime Emmy Award nomination for Outstanding Informational Special for I, Leonardo: A Journey of the Mind in 1983.

Major associations

Academy Awards

Emmy Awards

Tony Awards

Industry awards

BAFTA Awards

Golden Globe Award

Screen Actors Guild Award

Independent Spirit Award

Theatre awards

Drama Desk Award

Obie Awards

References 

Lists of awards received by American actor